Jack Symons (11 May 1912 – 23 November 1993) was an Australian rules footballer who played with Richmond and Fitzroy in the Victorian Football League (VFL).

A local, Symons made his debut for Richmond in 1934 and spent a decade with the club. He played in losing grand finals in 1940 and 1942 and when Richmond finally won the premiership in 1943 he was absent from the side. 

During the 1944 season he moved to Fitzroy and at the end of the year won his long-awaited premiership – against his former club, Richmond.

References 

 Hogan P: The Tigers Of Old, Richmond FC, Melbourne 1996

External links

2004 obituary of Maurie Hearn, mentioning Clen Denning and Laurie Bickerton as the surviving members of the Maroons' 1944 side

1912 births
Australian rules footballers from Victoria (Australia)
Fitzroy Football Club players
Fitzroy Football Club Premiership players
Richmond Football Club players
1993 deaths
One-time VFL/AFL Premiership players